Alkiškiai is a village in Akmenė district municipality, in Šiauliai County, in northwest Lithuania. According to the 2011 census, the village had a population of 374 people. The village is located near the Dabikinė river.

Famous villagers 
Jānis Buivids (1864–1937), Latvian army general.

References

Akmenė District Municipality
Villages in Šiauliai County